The 11097 / 11098 Poorna Express is an express train running between  to .  The Poorna Express runs only on Mondays starting from Ernakulum Junction at 23:20 IST and ends at Pune Junction at 5:05 IST 2 days later covering a total distance of 1435 km and crossing a total of 32 stations. From Pune is runs only on Saturday  starting at 23:30 Ist. The following is a detailed schedule for the train

Route & Halts

Traction
The train is hauled by a Pune-based WDM3D / WDP-4D locomotive from Pune to Ernakulam and vice versa.

Direction reversal
The train reverses its direction 2 times at:

 
 .

Rake sharing
The train shares its rake with 22149/22150 Pune–Ernakulam Express.

References

Named passenger trains of India
Rail transport in Maharashtra
Rail transport in Karnataka
Rail transport in Goa
Rail transport in Kerala
Transport in Kochi
Transport in Pune
Railway services introduced in 1999
Express trains in India